Canice Brennan is a former Kilkenny hurler who played with Conahy Shamrocks and the Kilkenny intercounty team. He was part of the Kilkenny team that won the All-Ireland in 2000, having played in previous finals and achieving success at minor and under-21 level.

He is a young brother of former hurler Kieran Brennan and former hurler and manager Nickey Brennan, who was also president of the GAA.

References

1972 births
Living people
Conahy Shamrocks hurlers
Kilkenny inter-county hurlers
Kilkenny Gaelic footballers
All-Ireland Senior Hurling Championship winners